Antoine Lavoisier (1743–1794) was a French chemist.

Lavoisier may also refer to:

People
 Marie-Anne Paulze Lavoisier (1758–1836), French chemist, wife and collaborator of Antoine Lavoisier
 Lavoisier Maia (1928–2021), Brazilian physician and politician

Other
 Lavoisier (crater), a lunar crater
 Lavoisier Group, an organisation based in Australia
 Lavoisier Island, a sub-Antarctic island
 Lavoisier Medal, a chemistry award